Emotion & Commotion is the tenth studio album by guitarist Jeff Beck, released in April 2010 on Atco Records. In addition to featuring vocal performances by Joss Stone, Imelda May, and Olivia Safe, the album showcases a 64-piece orchestra on several tracks, and includes covers of well-known songs such as "Over the Rainbow", "Corpus Christi Carol", "Lilac Wine", and other rock and classical works.

Chart performance
The album debuted at No. 11 on the Billboard 200 in the US, with sales of 26,000, Beck's highest debut in his 45-year career. His highest charting album is Blow by Blow produced by George Martin, which peaked at No. 4 in 1975 on the US Billboard album chart. The album has sold 123,000 copies in the US as of July 2016.

The album reached No. 21 in the UK and debuted at No. 9 in Canada. The album debuted at No. 1 in Japan on the Weekly International Album Sales Chart. It charted at No. 49 on the Australian charts, marking the first time Jeff Beck has appeared on the Australian album charts since Jeff Beck's Guitar Shop reached No. 99 in 1989.

The song "Hammerhead" won the 2011 Grammy Award for Best Rock Instrumental Performance. The track "Nessun Dorma" won a Grammy Award for Best Pop Instrumental Performance.

Track listing

Personnel
Jeff Beck – electric guitar
Joss Stone – vocals (tracks 5, 9)
Imelda May – vocals (track 7, 11)
Olivia Safe – vocals (track 6, 10)
Jason Rebello – keyboard
Pete Murray – keyboard, orchestral arrangement
Vinnie Colaiuta – drums, percussion (tracks 2, 3, 6, 9)
Clive Deamer – drums
Earl Harvin – drums
Alessia Mattalia – drums
Luís Jardim – percussion
Chris Bruce – bass guitar (track 7)
Pino Palladino – bass guitar (track 5)
Tal Wilkenfeld – bass guitar (tracks 2, 3, 6, 9)

Technical
Steve Lipson – production
Trevor Horn – executive production

Charts

References

Jeff Beck albums
2010 albums
Albums produced by Trevor Horn
Albums produced by Stephen Lipson
Atco Records albums